The Houston Astros' 1995 season was a season in American baseball. It involved the Houston Astros attempting to win the National League Central.

Offseason
 December 28, 1994: Ken Caminiti, Andújar Cedeño, Steve Finley, Roberto Petagine, Brian Williams and a player to be named later were traded by the Astros to the San Diego Padres for Derek Bell, Doug Brocail, Ricky Gutiérrez, Pedro A. Martínez, Phil Plantier, and Craig Shipley. The Astros completed the deal by sending Sean Fesh (minors) to the Padres on May 1, 1995.

Regular season

Opening Day starters
Jeff Bagwell
Derek Bell
Craig Biggio
Tony Eusebio
Luis Gonzalez
Darryl Kile
Dave Magadan
Orlando Miller
Phil Plantier

Season standings

Record vs. opponents

Notable transactions
 July 2, 1995: Johan Santana was signed as an amateur free agent by the Astros.
 July 19, 1995: Phil Plantier was traded by the Astros to the San Diego Padres for Rich Loiselle and Jeff Tabaka.
 August 10, 1995: The Astros traded a player to be named later to the Detroit Tigers for Mike Henneman. The Astros completed the deal by sending Phil Nevin to the Tigers on August 15.

Roster

Player stats

Batting

Starters by position
Note: Pos = Position; G = Games played; AB = At bats; H = Hits; Avg. = Batting average; HR = Home runs; RBI = Runs batted in

Other batters
Note: G = Games played; AB = At bats; H = Hits; Avg. = Batting average; HR = Home runs; RBI = Runs batted in

Pitching

Starting pitchers 
Note: G = Games pitched; IP = Innings pitched; W = Wins; L = Losses; ERA = Earned run average; SO = Strikeouts

Other pitchers 
Note: G = Games pitched; IP = Innings pitched; W = Wins; L = Losses; ERA = Earned run average; SO = Strikeouts

Relief pitchers 
Note: G = Games pitched; W = Wins; L = Losses; SV = Saves; ERA = Earned run average; SO = Strikeouts

Farm system

References

External links
1995 Houston Astros season at Baseball Reference

Houston Astros seasons
Houston Astros season
1995 in sports in Texas